Charles R. Boutin (March 7, 1942May 23, 2021) was an American attorney and politician who served in the Maryland House of Delegates from the 34A and 36th districts from 1999 to 2005, as a member of the Republican Party. Prior to his tenure in the state legislature he was active in local politics in Aberdeen, Maryland, with him serving on the city council and as mayor.

Boutin was born in Troy, New York, and educated at Christian Brothers Academy, Siena College with a Bachelor of Science in economics, and the University of Baltimore School of Law with a juris doctor. He was admitted to the Maryland State Bar Association. He entered politics when he was appointed to Harford County, Maryland Board of Education and served as the board's president before unsuccessfully running for county executive.

Boutin returned to politics in the 1990s when he was elected to the Aberdeen, Maryland city council and elected as the city's mayor. Afterwards he was elected to the Maryland House of Delegates which he served in until his appointment to the Maryland Public Service Commission. He served on the commission until his resignation after a sex scandal. He served in the Maryland Office of Administrative Hearings as a judge. He died from drowning in 2021.

Early life and education

Charles R. Boutin was born in Troy, New York, on March 7, 1942, to Charles R. Boutin Sr. He graduated from the Christian Brothers Academy in 1959, graduated from Siena College with a Bachelor of Science in economics in 1963, and graduated from the University of Baltimore School of Law with a juris doctor in 1970. Boutin was admitted to the Maryland State Bar Association in 1972. He married Cynthia Ann Shepherd, with whom he had three children, in 1976.

Career

Local politics

In 1977, Boutin was included as one of four people recommended by the Harford County Permanent Nominating Caucus, which had delegates from thirty-nine organizations, to fill one of two vacancies on the Harford County Board of Education and was one of three peopled endorsed by state Senator Arthur H. Helton Jr. for the position. Acting Governor Blair Lee III appointed Boutin and John Tillery Jr. to replace Thomas Snodgrass and George R. Litchfield on the board. Boutin served on the board of education from 1977 to 1981, and as president of the board from 1979 to 1981. He was succeeded as president by Tillery and Sue Ellen Johnson replaced him on the board of education after he resigned on December 31, 1981, to run for county executive.

In 1981, Boutin announced that he would run for the Democratic nomination for county executive of Harford County which was then held by J. Thomas Barranger. He placed fourth in the Democratic primary won by Habern W. Freeman.

He ran for a seat on the city council in Aberdeen, Maryland, in 1990, but lost to Evlynn Becker, Ruth Elliott, and George Englesson. Boutin served on the city council from 1992 to 1994. Boutin defeated incumbent Mayor Ruth Elliott, who was the first person to win a mayoral election in Aberdeen, in the 1994 election.

Maryland House of Delegates

Boutin and Michael D. Griffin won the Republican nomination to run for one of the seats in the Maryland House of Delegates from District 34A in 1998. He won in the general election alongside Democratic nominees Mary-Dulany James and B. Daniel Riley. He won reelection in 2002, alongside James while Riley lost reelection. He resigned from the state legislature to take a position on the Maryland Public Service Commission and Governor Bob Ehrlich replaced him with Sheryl Davis Kohl.

During his tenure in the House of Delegates he served on the Health and Government Operations, and Environmental Matters committees. He was a member of the Rural, Taxpayers Protection, Maryland Legislative Sportsmen's, and Veterans caucuses. From 2003 to 2005, he served as chief deputy Minority Whip.

Later life

Boutin began his term on the Maryland Public Service Commission on July 1, 2005, but resigned from the commission on March 7, 2007, after a convicted prostitute stated that she had spent over one hour with Boutin and used his state computer account to send emails to her. Governor Martin O'Malley appointed Lawrence Brenner to replace Boutin on the commission.

Chief Administrative Law Judge Thomas E. Dewberry selected Boutin to work as an administrative law judge at the Maryland Office of Administrative Hearings which he started on April 4, 2007, and worked as until 2012.

Boutin died after drowning in Rock Hall, Maryland, on May 23, 2021.

Political positions

Boutin proposed legislation while serving in the Maryland House of Delegates which would make observing animal fights a misdemeanor charge with a punishment of ninety days in jail and a $1,000 fine. It would also make the transportation and breeding of dogs for fighting a felony punishable by three years in prison and a $5,000 fine. Those who arranged fights would be punished with a felony conviction punishable by three years in prison and a $5,000 fine. He proposed an amendment to the Constitution of Maryland which would define marriage as only between a man and a woman.

Electoral history

References

External links

20th-century American politicians
21st-century American politicians
1942 births
2021 deaths
Mayors of places in Maryland
Members of the Maryland House of Delegates
People from Aberdeen, Maryland
Politicians from Troy, New York
School board members in Maryland
Siena College alumni
University of Baltimore School of Law alumni